Dries (Andres) Holten (30 January 1936 in Cimahi, West Java, Indonesia – 15 April 2020) was a Dutch singer, songwriter of Indo descent. He represented the Netherlands at the 1972 Eurovision Song Contest alongside Sandra Reemer. After he and Reemer broke up, Holten formed a new group with Rosy Pereira and called it Rosy & Andres. In 1980, Holten's final group was of him and Ria Shield Meyer.

Career

Sandra and Andres
In 1972 at Eurovision, along with fellow Dutch-Indonesian singer Sandra Reemer he represented the Netherlands with their song "Als het om de liefde gaat", the meaning in English is when love is concerned. He co-wrote the song with Hans van Hemert.

Rosy and Andres
In 1975, now having teamed up with another Indonesian singer, Rosy Pereira the daughter of steel guitarist Coy Pereira, they released the single "Sausilito". Holten co-wrote it with Marshal Manengkei. In the Netherlands it peaked at number 7 and spent four weeks on the charts.
The following year, it was reported in the 9 October 1976 issue of Billboard that their single "My Love" reached position number 3 in the Dutch chart, just behind "In Zaire" by Johnny Wakelin and with "Dancing Queen" by ABBA at no 1.

References

External links
 Andres Driesholten – Home 

1936 births
2020 deaths
Dutch male singers
Dutch songwriters
Eurovision Song Contest entrants of 1972
Eurovision Song Contest entrants for the Netherlands
People from Cimahi
Indo people